Striped goat usually refers to one of the following animals:

 Grisons Striped goat, a breed from Switzerland
 Peacock goat, a breed from Switzerland

It may also refer to:
 Las Chivas Rayadas (The Striped Goats), a 1962 Mexican film